Ernst Moerman (1897–1944) was a Belgian poetry writer and film director. He directed only one film, Monsieur Fantômas in 1937.

Biography 

During the 1920s, he was close to the Paris surrealist group, and wrote a theater play blending Tristan and Iseult, La vie imaginaire de Jésus-Christ and Fantômas 33. His film Monsieur Fantômas premiered on 12 October 1937 at the Royal Museums of Fine Arts of Belgium. René Magritte featured in this film.

Publications

Filmography 
 Monsieur Fantômas, 1937 (director, screenwriter, actor)

Further reading 
 
 Poetry translated by Samuel Beckett (Louis Armstrong, p 86, The Collected Works of Samuel Beckett, Grove Press, NY 2012).

References

External links 
 

Belgian film directors
1897 births
1944 deaths